The Military Gendarmerie (abbreviated ŻW) is a military police force established in 1990 in Poland as a specialized service of the Polish Armed Forces. 

The exact role of the gendarmerie has been historically difficult to ascertain, with several changes and developments since the fall of communism. Prior to the abandonment of conscription in 2009, the ZW was primarily concerned with the conscription efforts of the Polish Armed Forces and chasing down avoiders, however the unit returned to traditional military policing after this with a confusing hiatus of their public role and deployment for 10 years with ad-hoc deployment at the government's will. Since coronavirus however, ZW has taken an increasingly public and pervasive role in society with officers being a daily sight for most urban citizens.

In further confusion, in 2021 the Gendarmerie was demoted from a full service branch of the Polish Armed Forces, instead being classified as an "other" unit, alongside the Inspectorate of Armed Forces Support (logistics unit), the Warsaw Garrison (various representational and ceremonial duties in the capital), as well as the Operational Command and General Staff which are the main decisional organs in the chain of command. As of 2022, the unit also has a Criminal Directorate acting as an intelligence gathering unit for cybersecurity purposes.

History
The Polish Military Gendarmerie is a military police force that traces its history to the communist-era Military Internal Service, World War II-era Service for Protection of the Uprising, interwar-era military police in the Second Polish Republic, formations of the January and November Uprising, Duchy of Warsaw and finally, some officials of the Polish-Lithuanian Commonwealth, first created in early 17th century.

The modern Polish Military Gendarmerie was formed on 1 September 1990 on the basis of order No. Pf-42 / Org. Minister of National Defense of 18 April 1990 and order No. 062 / Org. Chief of the General Staff of the Polish Army of 15 June 1990. At this formation the structure was as follows:
 Headquarters of the Military Police in Warsaw
 Military Police Command:
 Warsaw Military District
 Pomeranian Military District
 Silesian Military District

In addition, the following Military Gendarmerie Departments were established: Warsaw, Krakow, Bydgoszcz, Szczecin, Wrocław and Poznań, and also the Military Gendarmerie Training Center in Mińsk Mazowiecki.

In August 2001, Sejm (lower house of parliament of Poland) passed Act on the Military Gendarmerie and other law enforcement authorities which specify tasks and authorities of the Military Gendarmerie.

In 2007, the Military Gendarmerie was granted partner status to the European Gendarmerie Force, and since 2015 become a full member.

Role in civilian policing
In October 2020, the Military Gendarmerie were ordered to help the civilian police in the "protection of safety and public order", starting from 28 October 2020. The order was given in the context of the COVID-19 pandemic in Poland. Since the beginning of the pandemic, the ZW has taken an increasingly public and pervasive role in the policing of society, often supplementing or fully overtaking the traditional roles of the national Police force.

Among other notable role changes and developments in the last two years, the ZW has overtaken all duties on patrolling the highways and national roads to inspect the goods of large trucks and their roadworthiness, and for the first time arrest powers were extended to the ZW when dealing with truck drivers who carry unregistered arms, drugs or illegal immigrants which fall out of the jurisdiction zones of the border force.

In urban areas, local ZW units have been signposted to augment the local police in carrying out pedestrianised patrols and fining drivers who do not follow pedestrian-priority road laws. It also appears that ZW has begun to augment the police and fire services in search operations – ZW equipment and personnel have begun to be deployed to search for missing persons. In the past, ZW units have been regularly deployed for this purpose to search for deserters and conscription-avoiders and much experience remains in this area. 

Most visibly to the public eye however is the expansion of use of ZW units in protection of public events and gatherings. ZW units have been increasingly regularly deployed to supplement or overtake the roles of the national police in overseeing public events, gatherings and sports events. Notably however, they have been excluded from protests (from which they are constitutionally banned) and VIP/government protection (unlike other Gendarmerie forces in Spain and France, however, in Poland this role is undertaken by the SOP.)

Structure
The ŻW is organized into:
 Headquarters
 3 special units
 10 units
 2 departments
 45 regional stations

Commanders
The current commander is gen. dyw. Tomasz Połuch.

 gen. bryg. (Brigadier General) Jerzy Jarosz (1 IX 1990 – 20 II 1992)
 Płk dypl. (Certified Officer) Henryk Piątkowski (11 III 1992 – 1 IV 1993)
 gen. bryg. (Brigadier General) Alfons Kupis (1 IV 1993 – 24 VII 2000)
 gen. dyw. (Divisional General) Jerzy Słowiński (1 VIII 2000 – 30 VII 2003)
 gen. dyw. (Divisional General) Bogusław Pacek (31 VII 2003 – 3 X 2006)
 gen. dyw. (Divisional General) Jan Żukowski (3 X 2006 – 1 I 2008)
 gen. bryg. (Brigadier General) Marek Witczak (2 I 2008 – 17 XII 2010)
 gen. bryg. (Brigadier General) Mirosław Rozmus (17 XII 2010 - 11 VI 2015)
 gen. bryg. (Brigadier General) Piotr Nidecki (12 VI 2015 - 24 XII 2015)
 gen. bryg. (Brigadier General) Tomasz Połuch (24 XII 2015 -)

Ranks

Officers

Enlisted

Equipment

Infantry weapons

Vehicles

Members who have died in service
Soldiers of the Military Police died during their official duties:
 Starszy kapral Krzysztof Sypień from the Military Gendarmerie Department in Krakow, † 11 VIII 2002 Krakow, posthumously promoted to platoon-leader.
 Starszy szeregowy Grzegorz Bukowski from the Special Branch of the Military Police in Mińsk Mazowiecki, † 15 June 2010 Afghanistan, posthumously promoted to the rank of Corporal.
 Starszy szeregowy Marcin Pastusiak from the Special Branch of the Military Police in Mińsk Mazowiecki, † 22 January 2011 Afghanistan, posthumously promoted to the rank of Sergeant.
 Starszy szeregowy Tomasz Janowski from the Special Branch of the Military Police in Gdynia, † 29 March 2016 Iraq, posthumously promoted to the rank of Sergeant.

See also
 European Gendarmerie Force

References

External links

  

Military of Poland
1990 establishments in Poland
Military police agencies of Poland
Poland